The 2019–20 NCAA Division I women's basketball season began in November 2019 and concluded prematurely on March 12, 2020, due to the COVID-19 pandemic. The 2020 NCAA Division I women's basketball tournament was scheduled to end at Smoothie King Center in New Orleans, Louisiana on April 5, 2020, but was ultimately canceled. All other postseason tournaments were canceled as well. It was the first cancellation in the history of the NCAA Division I women's basketball tournament. Practices officially began in late September 2019.

On December 31, 2020, South Carolina raised a banner recognizing a claim to a national championship for finishing first in the two major polls.

Season headlines
 June 18 – The ASUN Conference officially announced that Bellarmine University, currently a member of the NCAA Division II Great Lakes Valley Conference, would move to Division I and join the ASUN effective with the 2020–21 school year. 
 June 20 – The Summit League announced that the University of Missouri–Kansas City would return to the conference on July 1, 2020 after seven years in the Western Athletic Conference.
 June 21 – The Boston-area sports news website Digital Sports Desk reported that the University of Connecticut (UConn) was expected to announce by the end of the month that it would leave the American Athletic Conference to rejoin many of its former conference mates in the Big East Conference in 2020. The story was picked up by multiple national media outlets the next day.
 June 27 – The Big East and UConn jointly announced that the school would join the Big East; though the official announcements did not specify a time, it was expected that the Huskies would become members in 2020.
 July 26 – Multiple media reports indicated that UConn and The American had reached a buyout agreement that will lead to UConn joining the Big East in July 2020. The exit fee was reportedly $17 million.
 August 5 – The Horizon League announced that Purdue University Fort Wayne would leave the Summit League to join the Horizon League in July 2020.
 September 30
 California governor Gavin Newsom signed the Fair Pay to Play Act into law, which upon taking effect in 2023 will prohibit public colleges and universities in the state from punishing their athletes for earning endorsement income. The bill places the state in direct conflict with the NCAA's current business model, which prohibits college athletes from receiving such income. At the time the bill was signed, several other states were proposing similar laws.
 Officials at Tarleton State University, current members of the Division II Lone Star Conference, announced that the school had accepted an invitation to join the Western Athletic Conference. Full details, including the joining date, were expected to be revealed in the following days, but were delayed by more than a month.
 October 4 – Officials at the University of St. Thomas, a Minnesota school that will be expelled from its longtime athletic home of the NCAA Division III Minnesota Intercollegiate Athletic Conference (MIAC) in 2021, announced that the school had received an invitation to join the Summit League upon its MIAC departure. In order for St. Thomas to directly transition to the Summit, it must receive a waiver of an NCAA rule stating that Division III schools can only transition to Division II.
 October 29 – The NCAA board of governors voted unanimously to begin the process of changing institutional rules so that college athletes can profit from their names, images, and likenesses, while still maintaining a distinction between college and professional sports. The proposal calls for each of the three NCAA divisions to draft new rules consistent with this mandate, with a target date of January 2021.
 October 31 – The Associated Press preseason All-American team was released. Baylor center Lauren Cox and Oregon guard Sabrina Ionescu were unanimous selections (28 votes). Joining them on the team were Texas A&M guard Chennedy Carter (22 votes), Miami (FL) forward Beatrice Mompremier (20), and Maryland giard Kaila Charles (18). All were seniors except for Carter, a junior.
 November 5 – The first day of the regular season saw three players record triple-doubles, the most for a single day of play in NCAA history.
 Aliyah Boston of South Carolina had 12 points, 12 rebounds, and 10 blocks in the Gamecocks' 103–43 rout of Alabama State. She became the first player ever to record a triple-double in her first career game.
 Denia Davis-Stewart of Merrimack had 31 points, 13 rebounds, and 12 blocks in the Warriors' first game in NCAA Division I, a 79–64 win over UMass.
 Chelsea Olson of Youngstown State had 13 points, 10 rebounds, and 11 assists in the Penguins' 87–59 win over Canisius.
 November 9 – Preseason #1 Oregon defeated the US national team 93–86 in an exhibition, led by Ionescu's 30 points. This marked the first time that Team USA had lost to college competition since a 1999 loss to Tennessee.
 November 12 – The Western Athletic Conference officially announced Tarleton State's entry into the league effective July 1, 2020.
 November 16 – Ionescu became the first NCAA player, regardless of division or sex, to record a triple-double in four different seasons. She had 10 points, 13 rebounds, and 14 assists in the Ducks' 99–63 win over Texas Southern, extending her record for career triple-doubles to 19.
 November 21 – Kamiyah Street, the starting point guard for Kennesaw State, was arrested and charged with murder in the July 16, 2019 shooting death of a man whose body was found in the parking deck of an Atlanta apartment complex. Street was immediately suspended once KSU was notified of the charge.
 November 25 – Sierra'Li Wade, a freshman guard for Arkansas–Pine Bluff who had yet to make her debut for the team, was killed in a shooting in her hometown of Lake Village, Arkansas.
 November 30 – The Atlantis Paradise Island resort in The Bahamas announced that the Battle 4 Atlantis, a prominent early-season Division I men's tournament held at the resort, would add a women's tournament starting next season. The women's tournament will feature eight teams (the same number as the men's version), and will be held immediately before the men's tournament.
 February 7 – The Big South Conference officially announced that North Carolina A&T State University would leave its longtime home of the Mid-Eastern Athletic Conference for the Big South effective with the 2021–22 school year.
 February 18 – The NCAA announced that it was considering a proposal that would allow student-athletes in all sports a one-time waiver to transfer to a new school without having to sit out a season. This would place all NCAA sports under the same transfer rules; currently, first-time transfers are only required to sit out a season in baseball, men's and women's basketball, football, and men's ice hockey. The existing criteria for the waiver would be extended to these five sports—namely, a player must receive a transfer release from his or her previous school, leave that school academically eligible, maintain academic progress at the new school, and not be under any disciplinary suspension.
 Responses to the COVID-19 pandemic:
 March 10
 The Big West Conference announced that its men's and women's conference tournaments, with women's play starting on March 10 at Walter Pyramid at California State University, Long Beach and men's play starting on March 12 at the Honda Center in Anaheim, California, would be closed to spectators.
 The Ivy League canceled its 2020 men's and women's conference tournaments, both originally scheduled for March 14 and 15 at the Lavietes Pavilion on the campus of Harvard University. Regular-season champion Princeton was named the Ivy League's automatic qualifier for the NCAA Men's tournament.
 The Mid-American Conference did not initially cancel its men's and women's tournaments, which had begun on March 9 with first-round games at campus sites, but announced that the remainder of both tournaments, to be held at Rocket Mortgage FieldHouse in Cleveland from March 11–14, would be held under what it called a "restricted attendance policy". The only individuals allowed to attend games will be credentialed institutional personnel, credentialed media and broadcast crews, team party members, and family members of players. The conference would ultimately cancel its tournament on March 12 (see below).
 March 11
The NCAA announced that both the men's and women's entire NCAA tournaments would be conducted with "only essential staff and limited family attendance"
 March 12
 All Division I conference tournaments that had yet to be completed were canceled, even those in progress.
 Some schools—most notably Duke and Kansas—suspended all athletic travel indefinitely.
 The NCAA announced the decision to cancel both the men's and women's NCAA tournaments, as well as all championship events for the remainder of the 2019–20 academic year (including the NCAA Skiing Championships, then in progress).

Milestones and records
The following players reached the 2,000-point milestone during the season—Sabrina Ionescu and Ruthy Hebard, both of Oregon.

Ionescu and Hebard both reached the 1,000-rebound milestone during the season. Hebard reached this milestone in the same game in which Ionescu surpassed the 2,000-point mark. Ionescu reached the mark in Oregon's 74–66 win over Stanford on February 24, 2020, reaching two additional milestones during this game. She recorded her eighth triple-double of the season, tying her own record from last season for the most in a single season in NCAA history for either men or women. Ionescu also became the first player in NCAA basketball history with 2,000 points, 1,000 assists, and 1,000 rebounds in a career. She had previously joined Courtney Vandersloot of Gonzaga (2007–11) as the only Division I players with 2,000 points and 1,000 assists.

On December 18, Baylor guard Juicy Landrum set a new Division I women's record with 14 three-pointers in the Lady Bears' 111–43 rout of Arkansas State. This was more three-pointers than the Lady Bears had previously recorded as a team in a single game.

Four days later, Brittany Brewer of Texas Tech tied the Division I record for blocks in a game, recording 16 as part of a triple-double in the Lady Raiders' 83–38 rout of Louisiana–Monroe. Coincidentally, the previous record-holder, former TCU player Sandora Irvin, also reached that mark as part of a triple-double.

Conference membership changes
Two schools joined new conferences for the 2019–20 season. Both moved between Division I and Division II, with one joining Division I and the other leaving Division I.

In addition, two existing Division I teams assumed new athletic identities.

After the 2018–19 school year, Long Island University (LIU) merged the athletic programs of its two main campuses—the Division I LIU Brooklyn Blackbirds and Division II LIU Post Pioneers—into a single program that now plays as the LIU Sharks. The Sharks inherited the Division I and Northeast Conference memberships of the Brooklyn campus, with some sports to be based in Brooklyn and others at the Post campus in Brookville, New York. Specific to basketball, LIU announced that the unified men's and women's teams in that sport would be based in Brooklyn.

On July 1, 2019, the University of Missouri–Kansas City (UMKC) announced that its athletic program, formerly known as the UMKC Kangaroos, would officially become the Kansas City Roos, with "Roos" having long been used as a short form of the former "Kangaroos" nickname.

Arenas

New arenas
Robert Morris moved into the new UPMC Events Center after playing last season at the Student Recreation and Fitness Center, a facility at the school's North Athletic Complex. The Colonials played their first game there in November 2019.

Arenas closing
 James Madison played its final season at the JMU Convocation Center, home to the Dukes since 1982. The final game at the arena on February 29 was a women's game in which the Dukes defeated Delaware 69–64. JMU opened Atlantic Union Bank Center for the 2020–21 season.
 This was Liberty's final season playing games full-time at the Vines Center, home to the Flames since 1990. The school opened the adjoining Liberty Arena, with less than half of the capacity at Vines Center, for the 2020–21 season. The Vines Center will continue to be used for games in which attendance is expected to exceed 4,000.
 This was intended to be High Point's final season at the Millis Athletic Convocation Center, home to the Panthers since 1992. They planned to open the new Nido Quebin Arena and Conference Center for the 2020–21 season. However, construction delays brought on by COVID-19 led High Point to delay the new arena's opening until 2021–22.

Temporary arenas
 Immediately after the 2018–19 season, Duquesne began an extensive renovation of the on-campus Palumbo Center. When the venue reopens, expected for the 2020–21 school year, it will be renamed UPMC Cooper Fieldhouse, via a partnership between the University of Pittsburgh Medical Center and the family foundation of late Duquesne star Chuck Cooper, the first African American selected in an NBA draft. At the time of announcement, the final capacity of the renovated venue had not been determined, but Duquesne's athletic director expected it to have about the same capacity as the pre-renovation Palumbo Center (4,390). Duquesne's temporary home venue had also not yet been announced, but it was expected that PPG Paints Arena would be used for at least some men's home games. Duquesne revealed its plans for the 2019–20 women's season in two phases, announcing its non-conference schedule on September 5, 2019 and its conference schedule on September 30. The following four venues will be used:
 PPG Paints Arena will host two games. The first is the season opener; it will be the second leg of a doubleheader with the men's team. The second will be the opening leg of a doubleheader with the men.
 One game will be at Donahue Pavilion on the campus of Oakland Catholic High School in Pittsburgh's Oakland neighborhood.
 The bulk of the women's schedule, nine games in all, will be at the Kerr Fitness Center on the campus of La Roche University in the northern suburb of McCandless.
 The season finale will be at Robert Morris' new UPMC Events Center.

Season outlook

Pre-season polls

The top 25 from the AP and USA Today Coaches Polls.

Regular season

Early season tournaments

Upsets
An upset is a victory by an underdog team. In the context of NCAA Division I Women's Basketball, this generally constitutes an unranked team defeating a team currently ranked in the Top 25. This list will highlight those upsets of ranked teams by unranked teams as well as upsets of #1 teams. Rankings are from the AP poll.
Bold type indicates winning teams in "true road games"—i.e., those played on an opponent's home court (including secondary homes).

Conference winners and tournaments
Each of the 32 Division I athletic conferences ends its regular season with a single-elimination tournament. The team with the best regular-season record in each conference is given the number one seed in each tournament, with tiebreakers used as needed in the case of ties for the top seeding. The winners of these tournaments receive automatic invitations to the 2020 NCAA Division I women's basketball tournament.

Statistical leaders

Postseason

NCAA tournament

Conference standings

Award winners

All-America teams

The NCAA has never recognized a consensus All-America team in women's basketball. This differs from the practice in men's basketball, in which the NCAA uses a combination of selections by the Associated Press (AP), the National Association of Basketball Coaches (NABC), the Sporting News, and the United States Basketball Writers Association (USBWA) to determine a consensus All-America team. The selection of a consensus team is possible because all four organizations select at least a first and second team, with only the USBWA not selecting a third team.
 
Before the 2017–18 season, it was impossible for a consensus women's All-America team to be determined because the AP had been the only body that divided its women's selections into separate teams. The USBWA first named separate teams in 2017–18. The women's counterpart to the NABC, the Women's Basketball Coaches Association (WBCA), continues the USBWA's former practice of selecting a single 10-member (plus ties) team. The NCAA does not recognize Sporting News as an All-America selector in women's basketball.

Major player of the year awards
Wooden Award: Sabrina Ionescu, Oregon
Naismith Award: Sabrina Ionescu, Oregon
Associated Press Player of the Year: Sabrina Ionescu, Oregon
Wade Trophy: Sabrina Ionescu, Oregon
Ann Meyers Drysdale Women's Player of the Year (USBWA): Sabrina Ionescu, Oregon
espnW National Player of the Year: Sabrina Ionescu, Oregon

Major freshman of the year awards
Tamika Catchings Award (USBWA): Aliyah Boston, South Carolina
 WBCA Freshman of the Year: Aliyah Boston, South Carolina
 espnW Freshman of the Year: Aliyah Boston, South Carolina

Major coach of the year awards
Associated Press Coach of the Year: Dawn Staley, South Carolina
Naismith College Coach of the Year: Dawn Staley, South Carolina
 USBWA National Coach of the Year: Dawn Staley, South Carolina
WBCA National Coach of the Year: Dawn Staley, South Carolina
 espnW Coach of the Year: Dawn Staley, South Carolina

Other major awards
 Naismith Starting Five:
 Nancy Lieberman Award (top point guard): Sabrina Ionescu, Oregon
 Ann Meyers Drysdale Award (top shooting guard): Aari McDonald, Arizona
 Cheryl Miller Award (top small forward): Satou Sabally, Oregon
 Katrina McClain Award (top power forward): Ruthy Hebard, Oregon
 Lisa Leslie Award (top center): Aliyah Boston, South Carolina
 WBCA Defensive Player of the Year: DiDi Richards, Baylor
 Naismith Women's Defensive Player of the Year: DiDi Richards, Baylor
 Becky Hammon Mid-Major Player of the Year Award (inaugural award): Ciara Duffy, South Dakota
Senior CLASS Award (top senior on and off the court): Sabrina Ionescu, Oregon
Maggie Dixon Award (top rookie head coach): Amaka Agugua-Hamilton, Missouri State
Academic All-American of the Year (top scholar-athlete): Brittany Brewer, Texas Tech
Elite 90 Award (top GPA among upperclass players at Final Four): Not presented due to cancellation of the NCAA tournament
Pat Summitt Most Courageous Award: Lauren Cox, Baylor player (along with her sister Whitney, a player at Division II Lubbock Christian)

Coaching changes
Several teams changed coaches during and after the season.

See also

2019–20 NCAA Division I men's basketball season

Footnotes

References